Hallmoor School is a coeducational special school located in the Kitts Green area of Birmingham, West Midlands, England. It first opened in 1952; The school is for young people with special educational needs from age 4 to 19.

Previously a community school administered by Birmingham City Council, in April 2017 Hallmoor School converted to academy status. The school is now sponsored by the Forward Education Trust.

References

External links
Hallmoor School official website

Special schools in Birmingham, West Midlands
Academies in Birmingham, West Midlands
Educational institutions established in 1952
1952 establishments in England